Galatas, is a town located in the eastern part of the Peloponnese peninsula, Greece. It is the seat of the municipality of Troizinia-Methana, which belongs to the Islands regional unit. It is situated on the coast, opposite the island Poros, across a 400 m (1312 ft) wide strait. The community Galatas consists of the main town Galatas and the villages Agia Sotira, Vlachaiika and Saronida.

Description

Galatas is a large but tranquil coastal village with a small fishing fleet, located on the mainland of Peloponnese, between Epidavros and Porto Heli, opposite Poros Island.
Lemonodasos [a forest of lemon trees] is located about 3km outside the village, at Artimos en-route to Porto Heli. It has been a local and nationally well-known tourist attraction, popular also for school excursions but was really made famous by Sir Patrick Leigh Fermor, OBE and later by other well-known visitors such as Elizabeth Taylor and George Bush Snr. 
The main attraction at Lemonodasos was Kardasi, a flour-grinding watermill which utilized the power of a waterfall and operated for many years, until the demise of its owners. Recent interest though by an earth-loving family in renovating the abandoned buildings, now appears to be genuine and much anticipated.   
The local people of Galatas benefit from a regional Town Hall located within the village, with many services which also include a Citizen's Advice Bureau! 
Whilst the parents are occupied locally with agriculture, the children at Galatas receive primary, secondary and technical college education. Religious education, prayers and services take place in the local church of Agios Nikolaos.
Other essential facilities include a medical centre, two large national-chain supermarkets, independent local grocers, butchers, green-grocers, bakers, fresh fish from local fishermen, a weekly open-air vegetable market, chemists, hairdressers, florists, hardware & DIY shops, all essential professional Architectural, Civil Engineering & construction services, also tradesmen, several hotels, tavernas & restaurants, bars & cafes, computer-repair services, a petrol station, car & motorcycle sales & repairs, yacht dry-dock & marine craft repairs near Plaka beach, water-ski and other sport facilities, a football pitch, children's playgrounds, a camping site, etc.
Transport to Athens by modern coaches [3hours], hydrofoils & catamarans [1+hour] and ships [3hours] is prompt and regular, as is the service to Poros Island opposite by ferry-boat [5minutes] and water-taxi [3minutes].
The weather is moderate with warm summers and mild winters with modest rainfall. Earth quakes, thankfully, take place elsewhere and are seldom felt.

Historical population

Persons
Antonios Kriezis (in Troizina 1796–1865), a soldier who fought for the Greek War of Independence and a Prime minister of Greece between December 24, 1849 – May 28, 1854

See also

List of settlements in Attica

References

Troizinia-Methana
Populated places in Islands (regional unit)